
Jacques B. Brunius (born Jacques Henri Cottance, 16 September 1906 – 24 April 1967) was a French actor, director and writer, who was born in Paris and died in Exeter, UK. He was cremated in Sidmouth, with a tribute by Mesens.

Assistant director to Luis Buñuel on L'Âge d'or, he appeared in more than 30 movies, using several alternate names: Jacques Borel, J.B. Brunius, Jacques-Bernard Brunius, Jacques Brunius, Brunius, J.B.Brunius. He acted in many of the early, more political, movies of his friend Jean Renoir. During World War II he broadcast from England to France over Radio Londres. He married French-English actress Cecile Chevreau in 1951. Their son Richard was born in 1956.

Member of the surrealist group in France and then in England, with his friend E.L.T. Mesens, Conroy Maddox, Ithell Colquhoun, Simon Watson Taylor and Roland Penrose. Brunius attacked Toni del Renzio, who was married to Colquhoun and who was attempting to reanimate an inactive English group in 1942–3. Brunius' countersigned the tract Idolatry and Confusion, which condemned and mocked del Renzio unjustifiably. In reality, Mesens feared a takeover of the group leadership by del Renzio.

He never missed an opportunity to defend surrealism, and participated in many a radio show. In 1959, he undertook a vigorous defense of the poetic valor of nursery rhymes.

The text was published by John Lyle in Transforma(c)tion n°7 under the title Language and lore of children.

Filmography

Actor

1930: L'Âge d'or (a.k.a. The Golden Age), dir. Luis Buñuel.... Passer-by in the street  (uncredited)
1932: L'affaire est dans le sac (a.k.a. It's in the Bag), dir. Pierre Prévert .... Adrien, le client au béret (as J.B.Brunius)
1934: L'Hôtel du libre échange .... Le monsieur du train
1936: Le Crime de Monsieur Lange (a.k.a. The Crime of Monsieur Lange), dir. Jean Renoir (as J.B. Brunius) .... Mr. Baigneur
1936: Moutonnet
1936: Partie de campagne (a.k.a. A Day in the Country), dir. Jean Renoir  (as Jacques Borel) .... Rodolphe
1936: La Vie est à nous (a.k.a. Life Belongs to Us) .... Le président du conseil d'administration
1937: Le Temps des cerises (a.k.a. The Time of the Cherries) (as Jacques-Bernard Brunius) .... Le petit-fils du directeur
1938: Le Schpountz (a.k.a. Heartbeat), dir. Marcel Pagnol .... L'Accessoiriste
1938: La Bête humaine (a.k.a. Judas Was a Woman, The Human Beast), dir. Jean Renoir (uncredited) .... Un garçon de ferme
1940: The Mondesir Heir .... Le médecin
1950: The Wooden Horse .... André (as Jacques Brunius)
1951: The Dream of Andalusia (uncredited)
1951: Andalousie(uncredited)
1951: The Changing face of Europe .... Narrator, as himself
1951: Une fille à croquer (a.k.a. Good Enough to Eat, Le Petit Chaperon Rouge) (as Jacques Borel)
1951: The Lavender Hill Mob, dir Charles Crichton (as Jacques Brunius) .... Customs Official
1952: 24 Hours of a Woman's Life (a.k.a. Affair in Monte Carlo).... Concierge, Pension Lisa (as Jacques Brunius)
1953: South of Algiers (a.k.a. The Golden Mask) .... Kress (as Jacques Brunius)
1953: Sea Devils .... Fouche
1953: Always a Bride .... Inspector (as Jacques Brunius)
1953: Laughing Anne (a.k.a. Between the Tides) .... Frenchie
1954: Forbidden Cargo .... Det. Pierre Valance - French police
1955: To Paris with Love .... Monsieur Marconne
1955: Captain Gallant of the Foreign Legion (a.k.a. Foreign Legionnaire) (TV, 1 episode) .... Pakka
1955: The Cockleshell Heroes .... French Fisherman (as Jacques Brunius)
1955: Barbie (TV, 1 episode) .... Mr. Morrisot
1956: Wicked as They Come (a.k.a. Portrait in Smoke) .... Inspector Caron
1956: House of Secrets (a.k.a. Triple Deception) .... Lessage
1957: True as a Turtle (a.k.a. Plain Sailing) .... Monsieur Charbonnier
1957: Dangerous Exile .... De Chassagne (uncredited)
1958: Orders to Kill .... Cmndt. Morand
1960: The Miracle of St. Phillipe (TV episode) .... The Mayor
1960: The Four Just Men (TV, 1 episode) .... The Mayor
1961: Mon frère Jacques (TV), dir. Pierre Prévert .... himself
1961: The Greengage Summer (a.k.a. Loss of Innocence) .... M. Joubert
1964: The Yellow Rolls-Royce .... Duc d'Angoulême (England) (uncredited)
1965: Le Chant du monde (a.k.a. Song of the World) (as Jacques Borel)
1965: Return from the Ashes .... 1st Detective (uncredited)

Director
1953: The Blakes Slept Here
1952: Brief City
1952: To The Rescue
1951: The Changing Face of Europe (3rd segment: "Somewhere to Live")
1939: Violons d'Ingres (also as writer and editor)
1936: La Vie est à nous (a.k.a. The People of France) (also as writer and editor)

Assistant director
1930: L'Âge d'or (a.k.a. The Golden Age), dir. Luis Buñuel.
 1929: Le Requin

Radio Producer
1954 February 7 : Le docteur Miracle, two operas by Bizet and Lecocq, BBC Third Programme
1966 Christmas Day : Special Day on Lewis Carroll, France Culture

References

External links

 A Guide to the Jacques-B. Brunius Papers, 1929–1967 at Penn State University

1906 births
1967 deaths
French male film actors
Male actors from Paris
Film directors from Paris
20th-century French male actors